Brezje pri Grosupljem is a settlement just west of Grosuplje in central Slovenia. The area is part of the historical region of Lower Carniola. The Municipality of Grosuplje is now included in the Central Slovenia Statistical Region.

Name
The name of the settlement was changed from Brezje to Brezje pri Grosupljem in 1953.

References

External links
Brezje pri Grosupljem on Geopedia

Populated places in the Municipality of Grosuplje